Mitake Station is the name of two train stations in Japan:

 Mitake Station (Gifu)
 Mitake Station (Tokyo)
 

ja:御嵩駅